The 10th Cook Islands Parliament was a term of the Parliament of the Cook Islands.  Its composition was determined by the 1999 election, held on 16 June 1999. It lasted until 2004.

Initial party standings

Members

Initial MPs

The seat of Pukapuka–Nassau was initially vacant due to a tied vote and the need for a judicial recount.

Summary of changes
 The seat of Pukapuka–Nassau was found to be a dead tie after a judicial recount. The 1999 Pukapuka-Nassau by-election was found to be invalid. A second by-election was held on 28 September 2000 and resulted in the election of the Democratic Party's Tiaki Wuatai.
 In 2002 Tepure Tapaitau was disqualified from Parliament, precipitating the 2002 Penrhyn by-election. It was won by Wilkie Rasmussen, who was then a CIP candidate.
 Maria Heather died in June 2003, precipitating the 2003 Rua'au by-election. She was replaced by her husband, Geofrey Heather.

References

External links
 Former Members of the Cook Islands Parliament
 Cook Islands Elected Members of Parliament  1994-2014

Politics of the Cook Islands
1999 in the Cook Islands
2000 in the Cook Islands
2001 in the Cook Islands
2002 in the Cook Islands
2003 in the Cook Islands
2004 in the Cook Islands